Carodnia is an extinct genus of South American ungulate known from the Early Eocene of Brazil, Argentina, and Peru.
Carodnia is placed in the order Xenungulata  together with Etayoa and Notoetayoa.

Carodnia is the largest mammal known from the Eocene of South America. It was heavily built and had large canines and cheek teeth with a crested pattern like the uintatheres to which it can be related. In life, it would have been a tapir-sized animal. It bore strong resemblances to dinoceratans, although without tusks or ossicones.

Description 

Simpson noted that Carodnia resembles the primitive uintathere Probathyopsis. Although Paula Couto also made the same favorable comparison, he placed Carodnia in the new order Xenungulata.  concluded that Probathyopsis shares several dental characteristics with Carodnia, but that in the latter the anterior dentition of is more reduced, the second lower and upper premolars are enlarged and pointed, and that the first and second molars are more lophodont.  Gingerich thought the differences could justify a separate family for Carodnia but proposed that it should be included in Probathyopsis, grouped Carodnia with Pyrotheria but later concluded that this was a mistake.

Carodnia is characterized by bilophodont first and second molars and more complex lophate third molars, which suggests possible links to pyrotheres, uintatheres, and even arctocyonids.  The bones of the foot are short and robust and the digits terminate in broad, flat, and unfissured hoof-like unguals, unlike any other known meridiungulate.

C. feruglioi and C. cabrerai, from the Riochican in the SALMA classification of Patagonia, are known from only a few dental remains.  C. vieirai (from the Itaboraian SALMA of Itaborai) is known from much more complete dental, cranial, and postcranial remains including an almost complete mandible, many vertebrae, and several partial leg bones.

When  first described Carodnia and Ctalecarodnia, the former was known only from a left lower molar which was lacking in the latter, making a comparison very difficult.  , based on considerably more complete remains, concluded that the molars and premolars of both are indistinguishable and therefore reduced Ctalecarodnia to a synonym.  Paula Couto also noted that the dentition of C. cabrerai and C. feruglioi are similar except in size, and that C. feruglioi can be a juvenile C. cabrerai, but nevertheless left them as two distinct species.

Distribution 
Fossils of Carodnia have been found in:
 Peñas Coloradas Formation, Argentina
 Itaboraí Formation, Brazil
 Mogollón Formation, Peru

Itaboraian correlations

Notes

References

Bibliography 

 
 
 
 
 

Meridiungulata
Eocene mammals of South America
Casamayoran
Riochican
Itaboraian
Paleogene Argentina
Paleogene Brazil
Paleogene Peru
Fossils of Argentina
Fossils of Brazil
Fossils of Peru
Fossil taxa described in 1935
Taxa named by George Gaylord Simpson
Prehistoric placental genera
Itaboraí Formation